Astilboides, a genus of the saxifrage family containing only one species, Astilboides tabularis, a herbaceous perennial once included in the genus Rodgersia. It comes from China and differs from its former relatives mainly in its leaf shape. It is grown for its huge bright green, circular leaves to 36 in (90 cm) across with the stem attached to the center, and large fluffy  racemes of tiny white flowers produced in summer.

The Latin specific epithet tabularis means "tabular" or "flat", referring to the leaf formation.

Cultivation
Grown best in moist soils in a cool sheltered spot. It is usually seen at its best near water. It bears very little resemblance to the genus Astilbe after which it was named. Propagate from seed or divisions when dormant.

References

Lord, Tony (2003) Flora : The Gardener's Bible : More than 20,000 garden plants from around the world. London: Cassell.  
Botanica Sistematica

Garden plants
Saxifragaceae
Flora of China
Saxifragaceae genera
Monotypic Saxifragales genera